Book of Songs may refer to:
 Classic of Poetry, sometimes referred to as Book of Songs, an anthology of ancient Chinese poetry
 Kitab al-Aghani, a collection of poems and songs by 10th-century Arab scholar Abu al-Faraj al-Isfahani
 Buch der Lieder, a collection of poems written by 19th-century German poet and writer Heinrich Heine
 Book of Songs, a 2017 album by Sophie Koh

See also
 Book of Psalms, a book in the Hebrew Bible and Old Testament
 Book of Song, a historical text of the Liu Song Dynasty of the Southern Dynasties of China
 History of Song (book)
 Songbook (disambiguation)